Jeanette Adelaide Covacevich  (1945–2015) was a herpetologist in Queensland, Australia. As a senior curator of vertebrates at the Queensland Museum, she discovered and studied many reptiles and frogs in Queensland. Covacevich is most famous for rediscovering and describing the Inland Taipan snake (Oxyuranus microlepidotus), the world's most venomous snake. In addition, she described over thirty new species and genera including the Cape York striped blind snake (Ramphotyphlops chamodracaena), the Nangur spiny skink (Nangura spinosa), and the Bulburin leaf-tailed gecko  (Phyllurus caudiannulatus).

On 12 June 1995 she was awarded the Member of the Order of Australia for her contribution to science, in particular for herpetology and conservation.

Covacevich is commemorated in the scientific name of a species of earthworm, Terriswalkerius covacevichae; the Australian spiders, Zophorame covacevichae and Kababina covacevichae; the Australian frog, Pseudophryne covacevichae;  and the Australian gecko, Amalosia jacovae (J. A. Cov. + Latin suffix -ae).

References

1945 births
2015 deaths
People from Queensland
Australian herpetologists
Women herpetologists
Australian women biologists
Members of the Order of Australia
20th-century Australian women scientists
20th-century Australian zoologists
21st-century Australian women scientists
21st-century Australian zoologists
Australian curators
Australian women curators